Charles Harold Davis (7 January 1856 – 5 August 1933) was an American landscape painter.

Biography
He was born at Amesbury, Massachusetts. A pupil of the schools of the Boston Museum of Fine Arts, he was sent to Paris in 1880. Having studied at the Académie Julian under Jules Joseph Lefebvre and Gustave Boulanger, he went to Barbizon and painted much in the forest of Fontainebleau under the traditions of the men of thirty.

In 1890, Davis returned to the U.S., settling in Mystic, Connecticut. He shifted to Impressionism in his style, and took up the cloudscapes for which he became best-known. He eventually became a leading figure in the art colony that had developed in Mystic, and founded the Mystic Art Association in 1913.

He became a full member of the National Academy of Design in 1906, and received many awards, including a silver medal at the Paris Exhibition of 1889.

He is represented by important works in the Metropolitan Museum of Art, New York; the Corcoran Gallery of Art, Washington; the Pennsylvania Academy, Philadelphia, and the Boston Museum of Fine Arts.

References

Sources

External links
Extensive biography from 1995 Magazine Antiques
Bnet biography
Twelve exhibition catalogs available as a full-text PDF from The Metropolitan Museum of Art Libraries
 Nov 15, 2015 New York Times article on a retrospective of his work at the Bruce Museum in Greenwich, CT.

1856 births
1933 deaths
19th-century American painters
American male painters
20th-century American painters
American Impressionist painters
American landscape painters
National Academy of Design members
People from Mystic, Connecticut
19th-century American male artists
20th-century American male artists